Rhyscotus is a genus of armadillo woodlice, land crustacean isopods of the family Rhyscotidae. It was first described in 1885 by Gustav Budde-Lund.

The genus comprises the following species:

References

Further reading
 Schmalfuss, H. 2003. World catalog of terrestrial isopods (Isopoda: Oniscidea). Stuttgarter Beiträge zur Naturkunde, Serie A Nr. 654: 341 pp.

Woodlice
Isopod genera